The Grammy Award for Best Country Instrumental Performance was awarded from 1970 to 2011.  Between 1986 and 1989 the award was presented as the Grammy Award for Best Country Instrumental Performance (Orchestra, Group or Soloist).

In 2012 the award was discontinued in a major overhaul of Grammy categories. From 2012, the best instrumental performances in the country category were shifted to either the  Best Country Solo Performance or Best Country Duo/Group Performance categories, both newly formed.

Years reflect the year in which the Grammy Awards were presented, for works released in the previous year.

Recipients

References

Grammy Awards for country music